Thiruvilandur is a town situated to the north of the town of Mayiladuthurai in Tamil Nadu, India. The area is also called Indalur. It is considered to be a suburb of Mayiladuthurai. 

The town has Parimala Ranganatha Perumal temple of lord Vishnu.

References 

 

Cities and towns in Mayiladuthurai district